The Chinese Ambassador to the United Arab Emirates is the official representative of the People's Republic of China to the United Arab Emirates.

List of representatives

See also
China–United Arab Emirates relations

References 

Ambassadors of China to the United Arab Emirates
the United Arab Emirates
China